The United Progressive Kinabalu Organisation (abbrev: UPKO) is a multiracial political party based in Sabah, Malaysia. The party was rebranded from its previous party's name, United Pasokmomogun Kadazandusun Murut Organisation using the same UPKO acronym; which was a widely known Kadazan-Dusun-Murut based party in 2019. The party had earlier been renamed once before in 1999 from its initial 1994 formation name of Sabah Democratic Party. In August 2021, UPKO has officially joined the Pakatan Harapan (PH) coalition as a component party.

History

Sabah Democratic Party
The party started as Sabah Democratic Party (Parti Demokratik Sabah or PDS) which was founded by Bernard Giluk Dompok and other detractors who split from United Sabah Party (Parti Bersatu Sabah or PBS) soon after the Sabah state election in March 1994 to join the Barisan Nasional (BN) coalition. PBS had earlier won a majority in the Sabah State Legislative Assembly then but with the two breakaway factions setting their own spliter new parties of PDS by Dompok and another United Sabah People's Party (Parti Bersatu Rakyat Sabah or PBRS) by Joseph Kurup had caused the crumble of PBS new Sabah government and allowed BN to form the government instead. Part of the enticement offered by BN to the defectors was the promise of a rotating Chief Ministers of Sabah post, which Dompok held from 1998 to 1999. The defection from PBS however damaged the party at the 1995 federal election, in which it won no seats.

United Pasokmomogun Kadazandusun Murut Organisation
PDS was renamed as United Pasokmomogun Kadazandusun Murut Organisation (UPKO) or Pertubuhan Pasokmomogun Kadazandusun Murut Bersatu on 8 August 1999, taking the same acronym of the now defunct original United Pasokmomogun Kadazan Organisation, which was formed and dissolved in the 1960s by Fuad Stephens. The name of the new UPKO includes the words "Kadazandusun" and "Murut", with a new logo of a silhouette of Mount Kinabalu and was not a water buffalo as in the old UPKO logo. It was redefined as an ethnically-based party striving to voice the rights and advance the development of KDM populations of Sabah and the Orang Asli of Peninsular Malaysia.

The party won three federal seats at the 1999 election, and four at the 2004 as well as 2008 polls. In 2009, UPKO opened four divisions in Perak, seeking a foothold among local Orang Asli indigenous people. In the Malaysian general election, 2013, the party was reduced from four to three federal seats and from six to four state assembly seats. Dompok lost his federal seat to the People's Justice Party (PKR). The following year he resigned as the party's president, a position he had held for 20 years.

UPKO was one of the component parties in the Barisan Nasional (BN) coalition which ruled Malaysia until 2018. The party's core Sabahan indigenous constituency includes many Christians, while BN is, on a national scale, dominated by the United Malays National Organisation, an overtly Muslim-Malay party. While a member of the BN federal government, UPKO often spoke out about government policies affecting Christians. In 2013, the party's president Bernard Dompok distanced himself from Prime Minister Najib Razak on the contentious question of the use by Malaysian Christians of the word "Allah" to describe God. Najib had supported a government appeal to the High Court seeking to outlaw the word's use by a Christian newspaper; Dompok criticised the appeal and defended the right of Christians, especially indigenous Malaysians, to use the word.

UPKO also agitated, often against the national government of which it was a part, for tougher measures against illegal immigration in Sabah. In February 2012, UPKO succeeded in forcing the establishment of the Royal Commission of Inquiry on illegal immigrants in Sabah. In the same year one of the party's federal parliamentarians, Wilfred Bumburing, quit UPKO and joined the opposition PKR in protest at what he considered to be government inaction on illegal immigration.

UPKO was an advocate for the repeal of the Internal Security Act, which for over 50 years permitted detention without charge in certain circumstances. The law was repealed in 2011.

In the 2018 general election, the party won only one federal seat and five state assembly seats. Following this, the party's acting president Madius Tangau announced that UPKO with five of their party state assembly seats members had left BN to form a coalition government with the Sabah Heritage Party, alongside PKR, DAP and Amanah became a partner party for the Pakatan Harapan (PH) coalition instead.

United Progressive People of Kinabalu Organisation
The party was re-branded again as United Progressive People of Kinabalu Organisation or Pertubuhan Kinabalu Progresif Bersatu while retaining its existing UPKO acronym on 23 November 2019. There is also a slight change in UPKO's logo with the inclusion of a new colour, red while the Mount Kinabalu image remains. The party re-branding process was aimed to migrate from the communal politics to a universal and inclusive politics by opening the party membership to other races than KDM communities. On 26 August 2021, it officially joined opposition Pakatan Harapan coalition.

Leadership Structure 

Term 2023 - 2026

 Honorary President:
 Wilfred Madius Tangau 
 President:
 Ewon Benedick
 Deputy President:
 Donald Peter Mojuntin
 Vice-President:
 Pangiran Lalung
 Basari Sarkun
 Wong Thien Fook
 Laurentius Ambu
 Fairuz Bandar
 Gilbert Syam
 Selvester Taing
 Women Chief:
 Mohina Sidom
 Youth Chief:
 Felix Joseph Sitin Saang
 Secretary-General:
 Nelson Angang
 Deputy Secretary-General:
 Junsim Rumunzing
 Joisin Romut
 Treasurer-General:
 Dennison R. Indang
 Deputy Treasurer-General:
 Juliana Janni
 Carlye Lajimin

 Information Chief:
 Peter Jr. Naintin
 Deputy Information Chief:
 Jimmmy Barukang
 Organising Secretary:
 Carl Moosom
  Deputy Organising Secretary:
 Rowindy L. Odong
 Supreme Council Members:
 Junik Bajit
 Joesey Limy
 Jamil Majingkin
 Fauziah Kudus
 Jubilin Kilan
 Marcel Tambud
 Mat Lunad Agok
 Macquel Sagundai George
 Condrad Wong
 Terence Lee Swee Hong
 Patrick Epin
 Benjamin Taine
 George Sidis Majamin
 Benjamin Talah
 Seheral Linus (Generasi Muda Chief)
 Jairaiaz Joseph
 Georgina George
 Rogers Tiam @ Aloysius
 Suki Mee
 Juin Tannyuh
 Vioery Bin Eming
 Alvin Lee
 Executive Secretary:
 William Sampil
 State Liaison Officer:
 Perak: Suki Mee

Elected representatives 
UPKO currently holds two seats in the federal House of Representatives and one in the Sabah State Legislative Assembly.

Dewan Negara (Senate)

Senators 

 Sabah State Legislative Assembly:

Dewan Rakyat (House of Representatives)

Members of Parliament of the 15th Malaysian Parliament 

UPKO currently has 2 members in the Dewan Rakyat.

Dewan Undangan Negeri (State Legislative Assembly) 

Sabah State Legislative Assembly

General election results

State election results

See also 
 Politics of Malaysia
 List of political parties in Malaysia
 Sabah Democratic Party (PDS)
 United Pasokmomogun Kadazan Organisation (UPKO) (Old)

References

External links 
 

Political parties in Sabah
1964 establishments in Malaysia
Political parties established in 1994
Liberal parties in Malaysia
Ethnic political parties
Indigenist political parties